Jasnih bin Daya (born 13 September 1974) is a Malaysian politician who is serving as the State Assistant Minister of Finance from 2020 to 2023. He has served as the Member of Sabah State Legislative Assembly (MLA) for Pantai Dalit since September 2020.  He is an Parti Gagasan Rakyat Sabah, a component party of the Gabungan Rakyat Sabah (GRS) coalition.

Election results

Honours

  :
  Commander of the Order of Kinabalu (PGDK) – Datuk (2022)

References

Members of the Sabah State Legislative Assembly
Malaysian Muslims
Bajau people
United Malays National Organisation politicians
Living people
1974 births